Andrija Grbović (born 16 September 2003) is a Montenegrin professional basketball player for Mega Basket of the ABA League and the Basketball League of Serbia.

Early life and career 
Grbović was a member of Vizura prior he joined OrangeAcademy based in Ulm, Germany and affiliated to Ratiopharm Ulm in 2018. Afterwards, he joined the Mega Basket youth system in 2021. At the 2021–22 Junior ABA League, he averaged 22 points, 9.2 rebounds, and 1.8 assists per game. His team won the Junior ABA League that season, while was named the Junior ABA League MVP and received the Junior ABA League Ideal Starting Five selection.

Professional career 
Grbović joined the OrangeAcademy roster for the 2020–21 season of the German third-tier ProB league. In summer of 2021, he signed with Mega Basket and was immediately loaned to OKK Beograd for the 2021–22 KLS season. Grbović made his debut for Mega Basket at the 2022 Serbian SuperLeague playoffs.

National team career 
In August 2018, Grbović was a member of the Montenegro under-16 team that finished 14th at the FIBA U16 European Championship in Novi Sad, Serbia. Over seven tournament games, he averaged 6.3 points and 3.4 rebounds per game. In August 2019, he was a member of the national under-16 team that finished 4th at the FIBA U16 European Championship Division B in Podgorica, Montenegro. Over eight tournament games, he averaged 15.6 points, 7.4 rebounds, and 1.3 assists per game.

In July 2022, Grbović was a member of the Montenegro under-20 team that won a bronze medal at the FIBA U20 European Championship in Podgorica, Montenegro. Over seven tournament games, he averaged 12.1 points, 6.1 rebounds, and 2.1 assists per game.

References

External links 
 Profile at realgm.com
 Profile at eurobasket.com

2003 births
Living people
ABA League players
Basketball League of Serbia players
KK Mega Basket players
OKK Beograd players
Montenegrin expatriate basketball people in Germany
Montenegrin expatriate basketball people in Serbia
Montenegrin men's basketball players
Power forwards (basketball)
Small forwards
Sportspeople from Pljevlja